Sufi Chay is a river in north-west Iran, at 37° 19' 45" N, 46° 4' 36" E. The river rises at Mount Sahand in the mountains to the east of Lake Urmia, and flows south past Alavian and Senshon till it reaches Maragheh city where it turns east and enters Lake Urmia in a large delta at Bonab.

References

Maragheh
Rivers of Iran
Landforms of East Azerbaijan Province
Landforms of West Azerbaijan Province